Ege Arar (born 2 September 1996) is a Turkish professional basketball player for Petkim Spor of the Basketbol Süper Ligi (BSL).

Early years
In 2010, Ege was selected to play for the Galatasaray Academy, after a try-out against 37 other competing players in his age group. Ege was selected to the Turkish junior national Under-16 team, and he played at the 2012 FIBA Europe Under-16 Championship, where he won a gold medal.

In 2014, after leading Galatasaray's Under-18 junior team in the Istanbul youth league to a third place finish, and Galatasaray's Under-20 junior team to the final of the Turkish Developmental League (Geliştirme Ligi), he was selected to the Turkish national under-18 team.

He started in all of Turkey's games at the 2014 FIBA Europe Under-18 Championship, and won the gold medal at the tournament. Shortly after that, he was moved up to the senior men's club team of Galatasaray. He was initially given the jersey number 34, which was previously used by another former Galatasaray academy player, Doğukan Sönmez.

Professional career
Arar began his pro career during the 2014–15 season with the Turkish Super League club Galatasaray. With Galatasaray, he won the European-wide 2nd-tier level EuroCup championship during the 2015–16 season.

On 12 July 2020, he signed with newly promoted Petkim Spor of the Basketbol Süper Ligi.

On 10 August 2021, he has signed with and returned to Galatasaray of the Turkish BSL after one year break.

On 10 June 2022, he signed with and returned to Petkim Spor for a second stint.

Turkish national team
Arar was a member of the junior national teams of Turkey. With Turkey's junior national teams, he played at the following tournaments: the 2012 FIBA Europe Under-16 Championship, where he won a gold medal, the 2014 FIBA Europe Under-18 Championship, where he won a gold medal, the 2015 FIBA Under-19 World Championship, where he won a bronze medal, the 2015 FIBA Europe Under-20 Championship, where he won a bronze medal, and the 2016 FIBA Europe Under-20 Championship, where he won a bronze medal.

References

External links

 Ege Arar at draftexpress.com
 Ege Arar at eurobasket.com
 Ege Arar at euroleague.net
 Ege Arar at fiba.com (archive)
 Ege Arar at fiba.com (game center)
 Ege Arar at tblstat.net

1996 births
Living people
Centers (basketball)
Galatasaray S.K. (men's basketball) players
Petkim Spor players
Power forwards (basketball)
Basketball players from Istanbul
Turkish men's basketball players